Sandy Dvore (August 28, 1934 – November 20, 2020) was an American artist, graphic designer, and title designer.

Biography 
Sandy Dvore was born in Chicago, Illinois where he studied at the American Academy of Art from 1953-1954. He moved to California in 1958, aspiring to be an actor.

Around 1962, he met Hollywood publicist Guy McElwaine playing baseball, who represented Natalie Wood, Warren Beatty, Judy Garland and Tony Bennett and needed ads created. Through this connection, Dvore became well known for designing back cover art for Sammy Davis Jr. in Variety. Dvore then illustrated an ad for Judy Garland for Judy at Carnegie Hall which caught the attention of American theatrical agent and film producer Freddie Fields. The pair worked together for 13 years on numerous projects. Dvore would go on to illustrate hundreds of ads for stars like Frank Sinatra, Liza Minnelli, Natalie Wood, David Bowie, Mick Jagger, and Steve McQueen. His minimal but vibrant illustrated trade ads held the coveted back pages of The Hollywood Reporter and Variety for years.

Sandy Dvore is best known for his work in designing television title sequences, such as the walking partridges in The Partridge Family, and the brush-stroke logo and paintings from the long-running soap opera The Young and the Restless. His film title credits include the 1976 film Lipstick and the 1972 Blaxploitation thriller Blacula. He also designed the opening credits for selected seasons of the nighttime soap opera Knots Landing.

Dvore's work in graphic design won him an Emmy Award in 1987 for Carol, Carl, Whoopi and Robin.

Dvore died at home on the evening of November 20, 2020.

Logo design 

 United Artists
 Picturemaker Productions
 International Creative Management (ICM)
 Los Angeles International Film Exhibition (Filmex)
 Solo Cup Company
 Lorimar
 The Komack Company

Television Title Sequences 

 Knots Landing (TV Series) (1987-1989) (main titles design)
 The Young and the Restless (1973-1988 drawings and 1984-1999 logo)
 A Hobo's Christmas (1987) (TV Movie) (title designer)
 Sister Margaret and the Saturday Night Ladies (1987) (TV Movie) (main title designer)
 North and South, Book II (1986) (TV Miniseries) (title designer: main titles)
 North and South (TV Miniseries) (1985) (drawings)
 The Waltons (TV Series) (1973-1981) (main title designer)
 The Partridge Family (1970-1974) (TV Series)(main title designer)
 The Bold Ones: The New Doctors (1972-1973) (TV Series) (main title design)
 James Dean (1976) (TV Movie) (Illustrator: main titles)
 Breaking Up Is Hard to Do (1979) (TV Movie) (title designer: main titles)
 Police Story (TV Series) (1974-1978) (graphic artist)
 Jennifer Slept Here (1983-1984) (TV Series) (main title design)

Filmography 

 Lipstick (1976) (design graphics)
 For Pete's Sake (1974) (title designer)
 Jonathan Livingston Seagull (1973) (visual consultant)
 Scream Blacula Scream (1973) (title designer) Blacula (1972) (title designer)
 De Sade (1969) (title designer) 
 The Dunwich Horror (1970) (title designer)
 Three in the Attic (1968) (titles)
 Skidoo (1968) (titles)

References

External links
 
Sandy Dvore Title Sequences on Art of the Title

American graphic designers
Emmy Award winners
Film and television title designers
Logo designers
1934 births
2020 deaths
Artists from Chicago